Victor Harbor Road (and its southern sections Adelaide Road, Hindmarsh Road and Torrens Street through Victor Harbor) is a major road in South Australia that runs south from Main South Road at Old Noarlunga on the southern fringes of suburban Adelaide to Victor Harbor on the Fleurieu Peninsula. It is designated part of route A13.

Route
Victor Harbor Road commences at the intersection with Main South Road at Old Noarlunga and heads south through the McLaren Vale region, bypassing the towns of McLaren Vale and Willunga, and passes through Mount Compass, until it reaches Hindmarsh Valley, on the northern fringes of Victor Harbor, where it changes name to Adelaide Road, and continues south to meet with Port Elliot Road at Hayborough. It continues southwest as Hindmarsh Road, changing name to Torrens Street in central Victor Harbor, before ending at the intersection with Victoria Street in the city centre.

History
From Old Noarlunga the road originally ran southeast to McLaren Vale then straight south to Willunga, before climbing the Willunga Escarpment with a steep, winding narrow section called 'Willunga Hill'. In the 1970s a diversion was constructed, bypassing McLaren Vale and Willunga to the west through the McLaren Vale vineyards, and including a new 4-lane section climbing the Willunga Escarpment of the Mount Lofty Ranges. The steep winding ascent of the old road (now known as 'Old Willunga Hill' to differentiate it from the newer road) is regularly featured as part of cycling events such as the Tour Down Under due to its challenging climb. After ascending the new 'Willunga Hill', the road levels and rejoins its old route, gently descending to the town of Mount Compass.

Safety and upgrades
Traffic on the road has increased in recent years due to the rapidly increasing population of the coastal towns between Victor Harbor and Hindmarsh Island, and an expanding local tourism industry. Because of this the road has had high numbers of fatalities; 14 people lost their lives and 163 people were injured during 2000-2004. Due to its local notoriety the road has had significant works since early 2004 with resurfacing, overtaking lanes, increased police attention and the reduction of speed limits.

The Royal Automobile Association (RAA) rated the highway at a 4.5/10  which means it failed to pass certain benchmarks. RAA believes that if the road is duplicated will improve safety on the road remarkably.

The northern end of Victor Harbor Road, where it joins South Road, was for many years an unsignalled T-junction. Traffic travelling towards Adelaide on Victor Harbor road would have to stop at the intersection, and wait to turn right to South Road. South Road was often quite busy, and this caused congestion, with a line regularly reaching 500 metres, and sometimes even extending back a whole kilometre, to Robinson Road. Due to this, driver impatience was a regular occurrence, and was the cause of a number of crashes at the location. Between September 2009 and June 2010, major upgrades were undertaken at the intersection (as well as the South Road/Seaford Road/Patapinda Road intersection about 300 metres north on South Road), greatly increasing safety at the intersection. The single lane and stop system was replaced with traffic lights, with Victor Harbor Road widening to 3 lanes just before the intersection, and also South Road widened to 3 lanes. This also increased the ease of turning onto Seaford Road. Heading south on South Road, Victor Harbor Road and South Road have both also been widened with an additional 3rd lane, giving 2 lanes for the turn onto Victor Harbor Road, as well as 2 lanes to continue on South Road.

The intersection of Victor Harbor Road and Main Road, McLaren Vale, was notorious for fatal crashes. A freeway-style intersection, with a Main Road overpass, was completed in 2013.

Major intersections

See also

 Highways in Australia
 List of highways in South Australia

References

External links
Road Photos and Information Includes pictures of Victor Harbor Road before the 2009/10 upgrade.

Highways in Australia
Roads in South Australia